Vår Ulla låg i sängen och sov (Our Ulla lay in bed and slept) is Epistle No. 36 in the Swedish poet and performer Carl Michael Bellman's 1790 song collection, Fredman's Epistles. The epistle is subtitled "Rörande Ulla Winblad's flykt" (Concerning Ulla Winblad's flight). It begins with the innkeeper peeping through the keyhole to her bedroom and whispering with his friends as she sleeps, slowly waking up. Then she dresses ornately and enters the tavern, delighting the menfolk until she is suddenly arrested.

The epistle has been praised as a perfect example of Bellman's rococo style, narrated with a mix of earthy and poetic detail.

Background

Epistle

Music and verse form 

The song has nine stanzas, each of eighteen lines. It is in  time, marked Allegretto. The rhyming pattern is ABAB-CDCD-EFEF-GGH-IIH.

The source of the melody is a contredanse called Prins Fredric.

Lyrics  

The song was written sometime between 1773 and 1776. The epistle begins with the innkeeper whispering with his friends and peeping through the keyhole to Ulla bedroom as she lies asleep, gradually waking up. She stirs uneasily, wakes, and adorns herself in a manner "worthy of a Marie Antoinette": she "sprinkles her bosom 'with wine and rosewater', twines a pearl bracelet round her wrist and adorns her locks with a bo-peep hat". She enters the tavern, delighting the menfolk with her charms, and drinks a brandy with a lump of sugar. Then, disaster strikes: four ragged bailiffs arrive, arrest her, ignoring her shrieks, and lead her away.

Reception and legacy 

The epistle is in the opinion of Bellman's biographer, Paul Britten Austin, "a perfect—perhaps the perfect—example of Bellman at his most rococo". He writes that it is narrated with "a delightful blend of earthy and poetic detail, shimmering with humour". In his view, it is a "splendid poem, wherein Bellman shows immeasurable artistry, balance, and subtlety of effect". He states that it cannot, as earlier proposed, have been a response to William Hogarth's A Rake's Progress, and has none of Hogarth's moralization, but could perhaps be echoing Alexander Pope's The Rape of the Lock. 
 
Carina Burman writes in her biography of Bellman that people have from time to time wanted to change a word in the Epistle. The Bellman interpreter Cornelis Vreeswijk for some reason sings it with the word  ("water-glass") in place of Ulla's , a brandy-glass. The poet Per Daniel Amadeus Atterbom took issue with the word , lit. "thunder", meaning a fart that Ulla releases as she climbs into bed, pulling the quilt over her head. Burman comments that it is interesting that Atterbom took exception to a bodily function rather than sex.

The Epistle has been recorded by Mikael Samuelson and by Cornelis Vreeswijk.

Notes

References

Sources

 
 
 
 
  (contains the most popular Epistles and Songs, in Swedish, with sheet music)
  (with facsimiles of sheet music from first editions in 1790, 1791)

External links 

 Text of Epistle 36 on Bellman.net

Fredmans epistlar
18th-century songs